Jaime Garza (born September 10, 1959) is an American former professional boxer who competed from 1978 to 1995. He held the WBC super bantamweight title from 1983 to 1984.

Biography
Garza is of Mexican descent. In February 1978, he won his pro debut by knocking out Eduardo Villareal. On June 15, 1983 an undefeated Garza defeated Bobby Berna to win the WBC Super Bantamweight title. He would lose the title in his second defense against Juan Meza.

Professional boxing record

See also
List of world super-bantamweight boxing champions
List of Mexican boxing world champions

References

External links

 

|-

1959 births
Living people
American male boxers
Boxers from California
People from Santa Cruz, California
American boxers of Mexican descent
World Boxing Council champions
Super-bantamweight boxers
World super-bantamweight boxing champions